Mark Thompson may refer to:

Sports
 Mark Thompson (baseball) (born 1971), baseball player
 Mark Thompson (footballer) (born 1963), former Australian rules football premiership captain and coach
 Mark Scott Thompson, manager of the El Salvador national football team
 Mark Thompson (hurdler) (born 1967), Jamaican Olympic hurdler
 Mark Thompson (racing driver) (born 1951), American stock car racing driver, pilot, and businessman

Politics
 Mark Thompson (Minnesota politician) (born 1960), American politician
 Mark Thompson (Arizona politician), Arizona politician
 Mark R. Thompson (born 1960), expert on Southeast Asian politics

Others
 Mark Thompson (DJ) (born 1955), American radio personality, best known as half of Mark & Brian
 Mark Thompson (reporter) (born c. 1953), 1985 Pulitzer Prize–winning reporter
 Mark Thompson (author) (1952–2016), American journalist and author focused on LGBT topics and advocacy.
 Mark Thompson (media executive) (born 1957), chairman of Ancestry board of directors, former New York Times Co. CEO, former Director-General of the BBC
 Mark Thompson (newscaster), American television newscaster/announcer
 Mark Thompson (historian) (born 1959), British historian
 Mark Thompson (astronomer) (born 1973), British astronomer
 Mark Thompson (painter) (1812–1875), British painter
 Mark Thompson (chemist), Californian chemistry academic
 Mark Christian Thompson (born 1970), professor of English

See also
 Marc Thompson (disambiguation)
 Mark Thomson (disambiguation)